Fayantina Rural LLG is a local-level government (LLG) of Eastern Highlands Province, Papua New Guinea.

Wards
01. Yate
02. Kuru
03. Yameve
04. Kripave
05. Faiyantina
06. Nunofi
07. Fore
08. Kuana
09. Numuyagave
10. Krebave
11. Kofionka

References

Local-level governments of Eastern Highlands Province